James Edwin Verdieck (June 9, 1919 – October 26, 2001) was an American football and tennis coach. He served as the head football coach at Redlands University in Redlands, California from 1953 to 1958, compiling a record of 34–19–3.  Verdieck played college football at Stanford University as a center.  He was a member of Clark Shaughnessy's 1940 Stanford Indians football team, which went undefeated, winning the Pacific Coast Conference and the 1941 Rose Bowl.

Head coaching record

College football

References

External links
 

1919 births
2001 deaths
Menlo Oaks football coaches
Redlands Bulldogs football coaches
Sportspeople from San Bernardino County, California
Stanford Cardinal football players
College tennis coaches in the United States
Junior college football coaches in the United States
People from Colton, California
Players of American football from California